Dusty Henricksen (born February 2, 2003) is an American freestyle snowboarder.

In the 2021 X Games, Henricksen won gold medals in Slopestyle and Knuckle Huck.  Henricksen, who was 17 at the time, became the first U.S. male snowboarder to win the Winter X Games slopestyle snowboarding competition since Shaun White in 2009.

Henricksen made his debut in the Snowboard World Cup in Mammoth in March 2019, finishing 29th place in slopestyle. At the 2019 Junior World Championships in Kläppen, he finished 30th in Big Air and sixth in Slopestyle. After 23rd place in Modena and 17th place in Atlanta at the beginning of the 2019/20 season in Big Air, he achieved his first top ten place in the World Cup with ninth place in the Slopestyle in Laax and his first World Cup victory in the Slopestyle in Mammoth.

At the 2020 Winter Youth Olympic Games in Lausanne, Switzerland, Henricksen won the gold medal in slopestyle and also finished fourth in big air. At the end of February 2020, he finished second in slopestyle at the Burton US Open in Vail. He finished the 2020 season in 18th place in the Freestyle World Cup and third in the Slopestyle World Cup.

Henricksen was the first person to land a quadruple cork in a slopestyle competition at the 2020 Burton US Open, where he landed a backside quad cork 1800.
Dusty currently resides in Mammoth Lakes, California.

References

External links

 

2003 births
Living people

American male snowboarders
X Games athletes
American male freestyle skiers
People from Big Bear Lake, California
People from Mammoth Lakes, California
Snowboarders at the 2020 Winter Youth Olympics
Youth Olympic gold medalists for the United States
Snowboarders at the 2022 Winter Olympics
Olympic snowboarders of the United States
21st-century American people